Shakhram Akhadov (born 21 September 1996) is an Uzbekistani judoka.

He is the gold medallist of the 2018 Judo Grand Prix Tunis in the -66 kg category.

References

External links
 

1996 births
Living people
Uzbekistani male judoka
Asian Games competitors for Uzbekistan
Judoka at the 2018 Asian Games
20th-century Uzbekistani people
21st-century Uzbekistani people